The Bemidji State Beavers women's ice hockey program represented the Bemidji State University during the 2016-17 NCAA Division I women's ice hockey season.

Offseason
August 17: Ivana Bilic ('16) signed with the Connecticut Whale of the PHF.

Recruiting

2016–17 Beavers

Schedule

|-
!colspan=12 style=""| Regular Season

|-
!colspan=12 style=""| WCHA Tournament

References

Bemidji State
Bemidji State Beavers women's ice hockey seasons
Bemidji